Péter Bakonyi may refer to:

 Peter Bakonyi (fencer, born 1933), Hungarian-born Olympic foil and epee fencer who competed for Canada
 Péter Bakonyi (fencer, born 1938), Hungarian Olympic sabre fencer